Dhairyam (English: Courage) is a 2017 Indian Kannada film directed by Shiva Tejas who earlier directed Male (2015), and produced by Dr. K Raju under the banner Raj Production. The film stars Ajay Rao, Aditi Prabhudeva, P. Ravishankar, Sadhu Kokila, Jai Jagadish, and Honnavalli Krishna.

The music was composed by Emil, and art direction was done by K. Shiva Kumar. Stunt sequences were choreographed by Ravi Varma. The principal photography commenced on 18 September 2016 in Bangalore.
The film was later dubbed in Hindi as
Dhairyam in 2018 on rkd studio.

Plot

Dhairyam is about Ajay (Ajay Rao), a state level rank student who comes from a lower-middle-class background and is always in financial trouble. He falls in love with Parimala, whose parents are very practical about relationships and impose many terms and conditions in order for her to marry him. Ajay is already in too much of a burden as he has to arrange money for his father's cancer operation. The story is about how he manages these hurdles.

Cast
Ajay Rao as Ajay
Aditi Prabhudeva as Parimala
P. Ravishankar as DCP Kashyap														
Jai Jagadish as Minister Dhasharatha														
Sadhu Kokila as Politician														
Honnavalli Krishna as Ajay's father														
Srinivas Prabhu as Parimala's father														
Sangeetha as Parimala's mother														
Padhmini as Ajay's mother

Soundtrack

The film's score and soundtrack were composed by Emil.

References

External links
 

2017 films
2010s Kannada-language films
Indian action films
Indian vigilante films
Indian coming-of-age films
2017 action films
2010s coming-of-age films
2010s vigilante films